The Kingdom of Iberia was a Georgian monarchy from 302 BC to AD 580.

Kingdom of Iberia may also refer to:

 Kingdom of the Iberians, AD 888 to 1008
 Kingdom of Georgia, 1008 to 1490
 Kingdom of Kartli, 1460s to 1762

See also 
 Iberian Peninsula